A forum selection clause (sometimes called a dispute resolution clause, choice of court clause, jurisdiction clause or an arbitration clause, depending upon its form) in a contract with a conflict of laws element allows the parties to agree that any disputes relating to that contract will be resolved in a specific forum.  They usually operate in conjunction with a choice of law clause which determines the proper law of the relevant contract.

There are three principal types of clause:
 that all disputes must be litigated in a particular court in a jurisdiction agreed upon by the parties; 
 that disputes must be resolved pursuant to a dispute resolution process, such as mediation, arbitration, or a hearing before a special referee or expert determination; or
 the clause might refer to a combination, requiring a specific process to be carried out in a specific location, and if that process fails to resolve the issue, for litigation to be conducted in a particular court.

A simple forum selection clause covering both the proper law of the contract and the forum for resolving disputes might read:

When the clause chooses a particular jurisdiction for the resolution of disputes, it may do so either as an exclusive jurisdiction clause or a jurisdiction clause.  An exclusive jurisdiction clause mandates that all disputes must be resolved by a particular court, whereas jurisdiction confirms that a particular court may be used by the relevant parties, but does not preclude a party from commencing proceedings in another court if they wish to do so.

In many cross-border contracts, the forum for resolving disputes may not be the same as the country whose law governs the contract. The contract may provide for a staged procedure for resolving disputes.  For example:

Discussion
The choice of law stage in a conflict case requires the forum court to decide which of several competing laws should be applied to resolve the dispute. In this, there is an important distinction to be made between a forum selection clause and a choice of law clause. As an application of the public policy of freedom of contract, the parties are usually free to nominate the proper law under which all relevant disputes will be resolved. If there is an express selection, this choice will be respected so long as it is made bona fide, i.e. the subjective intention prevails unless the purpose is to:
evade the operation of some mandatory provisions of a relevant law,
there was an element of fraud or duress or undue influence involved in the signing of the contract, or
there was some other evidence of mala fides.
If the parties do no more than nominate a forum, this is no more than an indication that they intend that forum's law to apply. There are many reasons why parties may select a forum (see a discussion of forum shopping):
the forum has established significant expertise in the relevant areas of law, e.g. shipping, charterparties, carriage by air, etc.;
the standard of judicial decision making may be high:
there may be no corruption or other outside influence to affect the fairness of the judgments;
the procedures may be efficient and minimise losses arising through any delay in arriving at a judgment;
all the major witnesses may be resident within the jurisdiction making the forum convenient (see forum non conveniens); etc.
If the parties have selected a jurisdiction as the place for the resolution of a dispute, the implication is that the courts may nevertheless apply their lex fori which includes their general choice of law principles. Thus, in the ordinary course of legal events, the forum court may identify and apply a foreign law as the proper law. The majority of professionally drafted contracts will address both issues, and contain clauses specifying both the forum and the law to be applied therein. The fact that the  particular contract only specifies the forum therefore becomes highly revealing as implying that the parties intended to leave the choice of law issue to the forum nominated.

Where a contract does not contain a forum selection clause, the defendant may bring an action to have the plaintiff's action stayed based on the fact that the selected forum is not convenient (forum non conveniens).

Forum selection clauses have been criticised by a minority of courts as improper attempts to divest them of personal jurisdiction over the parties. Because of this, some jurisdictions refuse to give effect to these clauses, declaring them to be void as against public policy. However, most jurisdictions now recognise and enforce forum selection clauses, so long as the parties were acting in good faith.

Effect of breach
Although most contractual clauses are enforced by way of either an award of damages for breach, or by an injunction to restrain breach, the operation of jurisdiction clauses tends to operate at the interlocutory stage of a dispute.  The existence of a jurisdiction clause in an agreement will normally operate to enable a court to take jurisdiction in a particular matter, or may provide strong grounds for another court (not the chosen court) to decline jurisdiction.

Such clauses are sometimes enforced against proceedings in foreign courts by use of an anti-suit injunction.

Although it is theoretically possible to sue for damages for bringing proceedings in breach of a jurisdiction clause, examples are rare.

Related clauses

In a complex agreement the forum selection clause will often be accompanied by a number of related clauses (either in the same contract or in a collateral document).  These may include:
 appointment of an agent to receive service of process in the relevant jurisdiction - this facilitates initiating process and avoids the need to make an application to court for leave to serve a defendant out of the jurisdiction (service ex juris)
 waiver of any objection to the chosen forum - for example, parties may add a clause where each party waives their right to assert forum non conveniens. This precludes or limits the ability of litigants to apply for proceedings to be stayed or dismissed on the grounds that they have been brought in an inappropriate forum.
 contractual submission to the relevant jurisdiction - this assists in any application to enforce a subsequent judgment in another state
 waiver of a right to trial by jury in the relevant forum - especially if the chosen forum is in the United States
an arbitration clause requiring the parties to resolve their disputes through arbitration in the appropriate forum
 waiver of other procedural provisions which might apply to foreign litigants, such as the right the request they post security for costs
 waiver of any applicable sovereign immunity which a party might have the benefit of

Clauses in void contracts

Despite the general rule that if a contract is void each of the individual clauses in the contract are void, numerous legal systems, including English law, provide that jurisdiction and arbitration clauses are a special case, and that such clauses may still be relied upon even when it is part of the case of the person relying upon them that the contract is void.

Asymmetric clauses

Typically a forum selection clause applies to all parties to the contract.  However it is possible for a contract to state that if A wishes to sue B, then one procedure applies, and if B wishes to sue A, a different procedure applies.  The legality of asymmetric clauses differs in various legal system.  For example, they are generally enforceable under English law, but not under French law.

Similarly, one party may be afforded alternative dispute resolution options.  For example, a loan agreement may provide that if the borrower wishes to bring proceedings against the lender, that can only be done by way of arbitration.  But if the lender wishes to make a claim against the borrower they may do so by way of arbitration or by proceedings in a certain court.  These are various called "option clauses", "asymmetric clauses" or "hybrid clauses".

The situation in the U.S.
The United States Supreme Court has upheld forum selection clauses on several occasions, and has suggested that they should generally be enforced. See The Bremen v. Zapata Off-Shore Company, 407 U.S. 1 (1972); Carnival Cruise Lines, Inc. v. Shute, 499 U.S. 585 (1991).  The Bremen and Carnival Cruise cases, however, arose under the Court's admiralty jurisdiction, not under diversity of citizenship jurisdiction.

A court in the United States will not necessarily honor a simple forum selection clause whereas it is likely to respect a clause that points to a specific forum with the express exclusion of others. Two October 2011 appellate rulings illustrate the difference. In Future Industries of America v. Advanced UV Light GmbH, 10-3928, the United States Court of Appeals for the Second Circuit in New York City affirmed the dismissal of a case that sent the parties to Germany because the forum selection clause made German courts the exclusive forum. By contrast, the same court in Global Seafood Inc. v. Bantry Bay Mussels Ltd., 08-1358, affirmed the refusal of the lower court to refer the parties to Ireland because the clause was not exclusive, and the litigation continues in America.

The state of New York has a statute expressly dealing with those circumstances under which a New York court may not dismiss a case on the grounds of forum non conveniens if the parties' contract provides that the agreed upon venue is a court in New York and if the transaction involved an amount more than $1 million.

Currently, a U.S. Circuit Court split is emerging over whether forum selection clauses in a contract supersede pre-existing arbitration clauses in regulatory membership rules, such as FINRA.

Specific issues

Corporate bylaws 
Prior to 2010, it was uncommon for American corporations to insert forum selection clauses in their bylaws. But that situation changed. Surveying the case law in 2015, Bonnie Roe, Daniel Tabak, and Jonathan Hofer have argued (in Lexology) that forum selection bylaws have become an established part of corporate governance in only a few short years. Their conclusion is that a board of directors adopting a forum selection bylaw "can reasonably expect" that the bylaw will be enforced.

Consumer contracts 
The enforceability of forum selection clauses in the consumer field is controversial.  Many opponents of enforcement argue that the contracts that include such forum selection clause are contracts of "adhesion". This position is well summarized in an article in the Chicago-Kent Law Review by Marty Gould, who argues that, unlike most federal courts – which have enforced such clauses in the consumer context – a state court in Illinois correctly refused enforcement in connection with a claim relating to an online dating service contract. Proponents of enforceability take issue with the assertion of "adhesion".

Scope of a forum selection clause 
Courts are often required to determine whether a forum clause covers all parties (including non-signatories) to a transaction.  Many courts resolve the scope issue by applying the "closely related" test. See e.g. Manetti-Farrow, Inc. v. Gucci America, Inc. and Roby v. Lloyd’s. Writing in International Aspects of U.S. Litigation, Eric Sherby argues that most courts that have addressed the issue have glossed over the circular nature of the finding of "closely related" and that even those few judicial decisions that evince an awareness of the circularity problem have themselves fallen into the circular reasoning trap.

Franchise and dealership disputes 
A number of American states have enacted statutes that require franchisors to agree to litigate disputes with franchisees in-state. Those states include California, Wisconsin, and New Jersey. Although not all of these statutes contain language of exclusivity, the case law has generally interpreted these statutes as invalidating contractual clauses that require disputes to be resolved out of the franchisee’s home state.

The Situation in Canada 
Forum selection clauses were addressed by the Supreme Court of Canada in Z.I. Pompey v ECU Line, 2003 SCC 27. The dispute arose after a breach of a bill of lading resulted in damage to equipment in transit. The exclusive forum selection clause indicated that any claims had to be brought forth in Antwerp. The Supreme Court endorsed forum selection clauses for providing “certainty and security in transaction.” The Court reaffirmed the strong cause test found in the English Eleftheri case.

Absent other applicable legislation, the Pompey Test asks whether there is an enforceable contract binding the parties. If there is, the court must grant a stay unless the plaintiff demonstrates sufficiently strong reasons to show that they should not be bound by the forum selection clause. The Court, in exercising its discretion, should consider factors such as: where evidence is situated or more readily available, whether foreign law applies and whether it differs from domestic law, the country with which the parties are connected and how closely, whether the defendants are seeking procedural advantages, and whether the plaintiffs would be prejudiced by the need to sue in a foreign court.

Specific Issues

Commercial Contracts 
Forum selection clauses in a commercial contract are typically strictly enforced. In Expedition Helicopters Inc. v Honeywell Inc. [2010 ONCA 51], the Ontario Court of Appeal outlined factors which may justify departing from enforcement including: the plaintiff was induced to agree to the clause, the contract is otherwise unenforceable, the selected forum is unwilling or unable to accept jurisdiction, the claim or circumstances are outside of what was reasonably contemplated by the parties in agreeing to the clause, the plaintiff cannot longer expect a fair trial in the forum due to subsequent events that could not have been reasonably anticipated, or the enforcement of the clause would frustrate clear public policy.

Consumer Contracts

In Douez v Facebook, 2017 SCC 33, the Supreme Court of Canada refused to enforce a forum selection clause between Facebook and a class of users. The plurality of the Court found that the contract was enforceable. However, the plaintiff met the burden of demonstrating strong cause as to why the clause should not be enforced. Factors considered in the majority's decision included: the nature of the right (constitutional right to privacy), the gross inequality of bargaining power between the parties, the lack of alternatives for the consumers, the interest of the courts, clarity and certainty. Secondary factors included the relative cost and inconvenience to parties as well as the purpose and intent of the legislation. Justice Abella found that the contract was unconscionable and thus unenforceable under step one of the Pompey test.

In Uber Technologies Inc. v Heller, 2020 SCC 16, the Supreme Court of Canada also refused to enforce an arbitration clause between Uber and a class of drivers. The clause indicated that disputes were to be resolved by arbitration in the Netherlands. The majority held the clause was unconscionable and thus unenforceable. They assert that standard form contracts can create inequality of bargaining power between the parties. The Court asserted that choice of law, forum selection and forced arbitration clauses can deprive parties of possible remedies thus violating their reasonable expectations.

Consumer Contracts (Quebec)

Quebec's Civil Code renders forum-selection and arbitration clauses in consumer and employment contracts unenforceable. In consumer transactions involving Quebec residents, Article 3149 provides jurisdiction to Quebec Courts to hear the dispute.

Proposed international convention
In 2005, the Hague Conference on Private International Law issued the Hague Choice of Court Convention. The Hague Convention does not apply to disputes involving consumers. For example, Quebec's Consumer Protection Act

References

Contract law
Conflict of laws
Contract clauses
Venue (law)